Alexander was built in Aberdeen in 1813 or 1815. She started as a Plymouth-based transport. In 1817 the British Admiralty hired her as one of two vessels that would go on an expedition to search for a Northwest Passage. The expedition was unsuccessful. After her return in 1818, Alexander traded between Britain and North America. The last mention of Alexander in online sources was in 1830.

Career
Alexander first appeared in Lloyd's Register (LR) in 1814. She first appeared in the Register of Shipping in 1816, with the same information re master and trade.

Discovery expedition (1818-1819): The Admiralty hired Alexander in 1817 for a discovery expedition in 1818. She sailed with another hired vessel, and the whole expedition was under the command of Commander John Ross, who was sailing in Isabella. Of Alexanders crew of 37 men, four officers, including Lieutenant William Edward Parry, her captain, were clearly from the navy, as were her five marines. The other officers and men were probably civilians, as were John Allison and Joseph Phillips, the Greenland master and Greenland mate. Generally when the navy hired a vessel, it would put a naval officer in command, but keep on the master and crew.

The expedition left the Thames on 18 April 1818 and arrived at Lerwik on 30 April. By 1 June it was on the eastern side of Davis Strait. The expedition followed the coast of Baffin Bay without making any new discoveries.

In mid-November Alexander and Isabella were reported to have arrived in Brassa Sound, Lerwick. Neither had lost any crew nor had any ill.

Alexander, Lieutenant Parry, commander, arrived at Gravesend on 19 November 1818 from Baffin's Bay.

The registers were only as accurate as owners chose to keep them. LR continued to carry Alexander with data unchanged since 1819 and did not carry her after 1825. The RS did not update its information until circa 1823 when Alexander underwent a change of ownership. When she sailed to New Brunswick she brought back timber from Miramichi.

The last readily accessible press  mention of Alexander, Robinson, master, was that on 17 May 1829 Alexander, of Newcastle, Robinson, master, had come into Pictou leaky. She had spent several days on shore at Prince Edward's Island.

The Register of Shipping ceased publishing with the 1833 volume and still carried Alexander, Robinson, master.

Citations and references
Citations

References
 

1813 ships
Ships built in Aberdeen
Age of Sail merchant ships of England
Arctic exploration vessels
Exploration ships of the United Kingdom